The albums discography of American country singer-songwriter Bill Anderson contains 45 studio albums, three live albums, 13 compilation albums, four extended plays and one box set. He first signed with Decca Records in 1958 and started releasing singles which became major hits. However, Anderson's first album was not released until 1962. Entitled Bill Anderson Sings Country Heart Songs, the package was a compilation release containing his major hits up to that point. His debut studio release, Still, followed upon the success of its title track in 1963. The release peaked at number 10 on the Billboard Top Country Albums chart and number 36 on the Billboard 200, his only album to chart the latter survey. Over the next decade, Anderson released several albums per year, many of which reached the top ten on the Billboard country albums chart. His second studio release, Bill Anderson Sings (1964), reached number seven on the chart for example. In 1966, his fifth studio album, I Love You Drops, reached number one the country albums list. In 1967, Anderson recorded his first album of gospel music called I Can Do Nothing Alone, which reached number 23 on the country albums survey. His eighth studio record, For Loving You (1968), was a collaborative project with Jan Howard. It reached number six on the country albums chart.

Anderson continued releasing several albums per year into the 1970s. In the early half of the decade, only three studio projects reached the country albums top ten: Love Is a Sometimes Thing (1970), Bill and Jan (Or Jan and Bill) (1972), and Don't She Look Good (1972). By this period, he had released his second greatest hits package as well. In 1973, his label was renamed to MCA Records and his first album on the label was Bill, which reached number 15 on the Top Country Albums chart. In 1976, he collaborated on the first of two albums with Mary Lou Turner. Anderson's sound shifted towards a Countrypolitan style in the late 1970s. His studio releases Love...& Other Sad Stories (1978) and Ladies Choice (1979) were his final charting records on the country albums survey. Anderson continued releasing studio albums on independent labels in the 1980s, before recording Fine Wine (1998) for Warner Bros. Records. He then developed his own label, TWI, where he has been releasing new music since. His most recent studio record is 2020's The Hits Re-Imagined.

Studio albums

As lead artist

As a collaboration

Compilation albums

Other albums

Live albums

Box sets

Extended plays

Other album appearances

References

External links
 Bill Anderson discography at Discogs

Bill Anderson (singer) albums
Country music discographies
Discographies of American artists